Kalyana Mandapam is a 1971 Indian Telugu-language film produced and directed by V. Madhusudhana Rao. A remake of Puttanna Kanagal Gejje Pooje (1969), the film stars Sobhan Babu and Kanchana; Jaggayya, Anjali Devi, and Gummadi play key supporting roles. P. Adinarayana Rao composed the film's soundtrack and score, and S. Venkatarathnam handled the cinematography. The film was a commercial success, completing a 100-day run.

Plot 
Annapurna, a devadasi, aspires to lead a normal married life. She falls in love with Chandrasekhar, a musician, and begets a child named Chandramukhi. As Chandrasekhar fails to return to her, Annapurna is pressured by her mother Ranganayaki to be a rich man's mistress. Annapurna accepts, and aims to help Chandramukhi lead a respectable married life when she grows up. The rich man moves Annapurna's family to Rajahmundry, where Chandramukhi meets Avadhani, a scholar with a progressive outlook. She considers him her master, and befriends his children Ramu and Lalitha.

Fifteen years later, Ramu promises to marry Chandramukhi. One day, Chandrasekhar, who happens to be Avadhani's childhood friend, comes to meet him and ends up visiting Annapurna's place that night. He explains to her the circumstance that led him to marry another woman. While Chandramukhi is happy to find her father, Chandrasekhar requests her not to let out the secret that he is her biological father. Seeing Chandramukhi with Chandrasekhar from his window, not knowing that he is her biological father, Ramu misunderstands her and agrees to marry the latter's daughter, whoi happens to be his legal heir. Chandramukhi accepts her fate, and agrees to be initiated into the family tradition of being a devadasi. Later, she kills herself at a temple by swallowing the diamond in the ring gifted by Chandrasekhar.

Cast 
Sobhan Babu as Ramu
Adinarayana as young Ramu
Kanchana as Chandramukhi
Sridevi as young Chandramukhi
Jaggayya as Avadhani
Anjali Devi as Annapurna
Gummadi as Chandrasekhar
Ramaprabha as Savitri
Nagabhushanam as Savitri's husband
Pandari Bai as Avadhani's wife
Annapoornamma as Ranganayakamma
Sandhyarani as Lalitha
Brahmaji as young Lalitha

Soundtrack 
 "Chukkalu Pade Subha Mantram" (Lyrics: Devulapalli Krishnasastri) -
 "Piliche Varunte Palikenu Nenu" -
 "Sarigama Padanisa Nidapa Magarisa Ani Palikevarunte" (Lyrics: Devulapalli Krishnasastri) -

Notes

References

External links 

1970s Telugu-language films
1971 drama films
1971 films
Films directed by V. Madhusudhana Rao
Indian drama films
Telugu remakes of Kannada films
Films scored by P. Adinarayana Rao